The Battle of Baesweiler (22 August 1371) was a conflict between the duke of Luxembourg-Brabant against the Duke of Jülich.

Background 
Attacks on Brabant's commercial interests in the territory of the Duke of Jülich had almost caused war in 1367 and 1369. After mercenaries robbed a number of Brabantine merchants on the territory of William II, Duke of Jülich in 1371, William refused to pay reparation to Wenceslaus I of Luxembourg, husband of the Duchess of Brabant, let alone punish the mercenaries, instead protecting them and even hiring some.

Wenceslas prepared his forces and tried to attack the Duke of Jülich. William however sought help from his brother in law, Edward, Duke of Guelders.

The battle 

On 20 August, Wenceslas led his army from the border town of Maastricht towards the enemy capital of Jülich. The army advanced slowly, burning and looting as it went and by the evening of 21 August was encamped near the town of Baesweiler north of Aachen. On 22 August, Wenceslas' army was confronted by the smaller force of the Duke of Jülich. Two different versions of what happened next are recorded. In one, the army of Jülich attacked in the morning while the Brabant forces were at mass. In the other, the army of Brabant had the best of the fighting until the late appearance of the troops of the Duke of Guelders, perhaps from ambush. The battle ended with the capture of the Duke of Brabant, the Duke of Luxembourg and William, Margrave of Namur, and the death of the Duke of Guelders. Guy I of Luxembourg, Count of Ligny, a distant relative of the Wenceslas, was also killed.

References

See also 
Slag bij Baesweiler
Chronicle "Brabantsche Yeesten" in medieval Dutch

Baesweiler
Baeswiler
History of the Rhineland
1371 in Europe
Baesweiler
Baesweiler